Sir Montague Edward Smith (25 December 1806 – 3 May 1891) was a British barrister and judge who served as one of the last Justices of the Court of Common Pleas.

Early life
Smith was born Edward Montague Smith on 25 December 1806, to Thomas Smith, an attorney, and Margaret Colville. As an adult he reversed the order of his Christian and middle names, and was known as Montague. Following an education at Bideford Grammar School, Smith was articled to his father in 1823, practising on his own after his father died five years later.

Career
On 1 November 1830 he joined Gray's Inn, where he was called to the Bar on 18 November 1835. Practising on the Western circuit, which had recently seen its best barristers appointed to judicial posts, Smith quickly built up a large practice. On 11 May 1839 he transferred to the Middle Temple, which he became a Bencher of on 22 November 1853 and Treasurer of in 1863. On 28 June 1853 he was made a Queen's Counsel (QC).

At the 1859 general election, Smith was returned as a Conservative Member of Parliament for Truro. He spoke little within Parliament, but did succeed in passing an Act to limit crown suits in 1861. On 7 February 1865 he was made a Justice of the Court of Common Pleas, hearing cases such as Readhead v Midland Railway Company, and Rylands v Fletcher. A physical defect made travelling difficult, limiting his effectiveness as a judge of the normal Westminster courts. On 3 November 1871, he moved from the Court of Common Pleas to the Judicial Committee of the Privy Council, and was temporarily replaced by Robert Collier, allowing Collier to also qualify to join the Committee. He retired on 12 December 1881 and died at his home in Park Lane, London, on 3 May 1891. He is buried at Kensal Green Cemetery, London.

Arms

References

External links 
 

1806 births
1891 deaths
Burials at Kensal Green Cemetery
Members of the Parliament of the United Kingdom for Truro
19th-century English judges
Justices of the Common Pleas
Members of the Privy Council of the United Kingdom
Members of the Judicial Committee of the Privy Council
UK MPs 1859–1865
Conservative Party (UK) MPs for English constituencies